The 1991 AFL Foster's Cup was the Australian Football League pre-season cup competition played in its entirety before the 1991 season began.

Games

1st Round

|- bgcolor="#CCCCFF"
| Home team
| Home team score
| Away team
| Away team score
| Ground
| Crowd
| Date
|- bgcolor="#FFFFFF"
| Carlton
| 27.9 (171)
| Fitzroy
| 13.8 (86)
| North Hobart Oval
| 10,100
| Sunday, 3 February
|- bgcolor="#FFFFFF"
|  Footscray
| 9.6 (60)
| Hawthorn
| 19.25 (139)
| Waverley Park
| 13,196
| Wednesday, 6 February
|- bgcolor="#FFFFFF"
| Collingwood
| 11.17 (83)
| Brisbane
| 20.20 (140)
| Gabba
| 12,461
| Sunday, 10 February
|- bgcolor="#FFFFFF"
| Geelong
| 11.13 (79)
| Adelaide
| 23.18 (156)
| Football Park
| 20,069
| Wednesday, 13 February
|- bgcolor="#FFFFFF"
| St Kilda
| 12.10 (82)
| West Coast
| 9.11 (65)
| Waverley Park
| 13,625
| Saturday, 16 February
|- bgcolor="#FFFFFF"
| Melbourne
| 15.13 (103)
| Richmond
| 12.10 (82)
| Waverley Park
| 14,993
| Wednesday, 20 February
|- bgcolor="#FFFFFF"
| North Melbourne
| 19.20 (134)
| Sydney
| 13.17 (95)
| Bruce Stadium
| 5,120
| Sunday, 24 February

Quarter-finals

|- bgcolor="#CCCCFF"
| Home team
| Home team score
| Away team
| Away team score
| Ground
| Crowd
| Date
|- bgcolor="#FFFFFF"
|  Carlton
| 14.15 (99)
| Essendon
| 17.7 (109)
| Waverley Park
| 20,435
| Saturday, 23 February
|- bgcolor="#FFFFFF"
| Hawthorn
|17.15 (117)
|  Brisbane
| 10.8 (68)
| Waverley Park
| 8,070
| Wednesday, 27 February
|- bgcolor="#FFFFFF"
| St Kilda
| 10.16 (76)
| Adelaide
| 12.14 (86)
| Waverley Park
| 16,729
| Saturday, 2 March
|- bgcolor="#FFFFFF"
| Melbourne
| 11.14 (80)
| North Melbourne
| 13.12 (90)
| Waverley Park
| 9,030
| Sunday, 3 March

Semi-finals

|- bgcolor="#CCCCFF"
| Home team
| Home team score
| Away team
| Away team score
| Ground
| Crowd
| Date
|- bgcolor="#FFFFFF"
|  Essendon
| 6.11 (47)
| Hawthorn
| 22.17 (149)
| Waverley Park
| 20,508
| Wednesday, 6 March
|- bgcolor="#FFFFFF"
| North Melbourne
| 15.13 (103)
| Adelaide
| 6.9 (45)
| Waverley Park
| 9,882
| Saturday, 9 March

Final

|- bgcolor="#CCCCFF"
| Home team
| Home team score
| Away team
| Away team score
| Ground
| Crowd
| Date
|- bgcolor="#FFFFFF"
| Hawthorn
| 14.19 (103)
| North Melbourne
| 7.12 (54)
| Waverley Park
| 46,629
| Saturday, 16 March

See also

List of Australian Football League night premiers
1991 AFL season

References

Australian Football League pre-season competition
Fosters Cup, 1991